West Point is an unincorporated community in Morrow County, in the U.S. state of Ohio.

History
West Point was laid out around 1848. The post office at West Point had the name Whetstone. A post office called Whetstone was established in 1827, and remained in operation until 1964. Besides the post office, West Point had a church and country store.

References

Unincorporated communities in Morrow County, Ohio
1848 establishments in Ohio
Populated places established in 1848
Unincorporated communities in Ohio